George H. Taggart (March 11, 1865 - August 26, 1958) was an American genre painter and portraitist.

Life
Taggart was born on March 11, 1865, in Evans Mills, New York. He attended the Académie Julian in Paris, France, where he was trained by William-Adolphe Bouguereau, Gabriel Ferrier, and Jules Joseph Lefebvre. He first exhibited his work in France at the Paris Salon and in Toulouse.

Taggart returned to New York, where he exhibited his work at the National Academy of Design in 1898. He moved to Salt Lake City, Utah in 1900, and he was asked to do paintings for Brigham Young University and the Salt Lake Temple of the Church of Jesus Christ of Latter-day Saints. For example, he did a portrait of Joseph Smith in 1902, and a group portrait of the Quorum of the Twelve in 1903. He painted many portraits of prominent Utahns, including Salt Lake City Mayor Ezra Thompson. He traveled to Mexico to do a portrait of President Porfirio Díaz in 1903. His artwork was collected by Guillermo Landa y Escandón and Wilhelm II, German Emperor.

Taggart married Mary Dickson Sample. He died August 26, 1958, in Port Washington, New York, and he was buried in the Brookside Cemetery in Watertown, New York.

References

External links
Search Results:  "Taggart, George Henry 1865-1924" on the Smithsonian Institution website

1865 births
1958 deaths
People from Port Washington, New York
Académie Julian alumni
American genre painters
American male painters
American portrait painters
Painters from New York (state)
19th-century American painters
19th-century American male artists
20th-century American painters
20th-century American male artists